Wayang beber is an Indonesian wayang performance art whose presentation is manifested in a stretch sheets of paper or cloth with pictures in the stylized wayang accompanied by a narration by a dalang. Wayang beber performances emerged and developed in Java in pre-Islamic times, but continued into the Islamic kingdoms (such as the Sultanate of Mataram). The stories shown are taken from the Mahabharata and the Ramayana. After Islam became the main religion in Java, more Panji stories were shown. Wayang beber bears a strong resemblance to narrative in the form of pictorial ballads common at annual fairs in medieval and early modern Europe. They too suffered the same fate—nearly extinct, although there are still groups of artists who support wayang beber in places like Surakarta (Solo) in Central Java.

History

The first foreign records of this performance were reported by Ma Huan and Fei Xin in the book Ying-Yai-Sheng-Lan. The book tells of Zheng He's visit to Java in about 1413-1415 (the Majapahit kingdom was led by Wikramawardhana, son of Hayam Wuruk). They saw crowds of people listening to someone tell a story about the pictures displayed on a partially rolled sheet of paper. The storyteller holds a piece of wood which is used to point to the pictures on the sheet. Such practices are still the same as wayang beber performances in later times. However, according to the narrative of the Javanese poets, wayang beber started from the Pajajaran Kingdom.

The pictures of the wayang scenes are depicted on sheets of cloth or deluwang, each sheet containing several scenes (called (pe)jagong) according to the order of the story. These images are played in a "displayed" way, i.e. unrolling according to the scene one by one. Dalang tells about things related to the scenes shown, including dialogue. It is said that by Walisanga, including Sunan Kalijaga, wayang beber was modified into a leather puppet with ornamental forms that are known today, because Islamic teachings do not recommend the form of images of living creatures (humans, animals) or statues and add the Heirloom of Hyang Kalimusada. The Wayang, which were modified by the saints, were used to spread the teachings of Islam and what we know today.

Today

There are two collections of wayang beber heirlooms which are collected privately by the descendants of the dalang. Both of them brought the Panji story. The first is one of the oldest wayang beber which is kept in Karangtalun Hamlet, Gedompol Village, Donorojo, Pacitan. This puppet is made on a large Paper mulberry (daluang) made in Ponorogo and held by someone who has been trusted to maintain it for generations and will not be held by people of different descent because they believe that it is an ancestral mandate that must be preserved. The story is "Jaka Kembang Kuning", consisting of six scrolls with each scroll containing four scenes (pejagong). This story according to R.M. Sayid is an allusion to the expulsion of the Sultan of Mataram, Amangkurat I, from the Mataram Palace in Plered because of the Trunajaya Rebellion.

In addition to Pacitan, the second collection is maintained in the Hamlet of Titlean, Bejiharjo Village, Karangmojo, Gunungkidul. The story that was raised was Remeng Mangunjaya.

According to Mirudo's Sastro Book, wayang beber was made in 1283, with Condro Sengkolo Gunaning Bujonggo Nembah Ing Dewo (1283), then continued by the son of Prabu Bhre Wijaya, Raden Sungging Prabangkara, in making wayang beber.

See also

 Wayang
 Wayang kulit
 Wayang golek

References

 
Indonesian culture
Masterpieces of the Oral and Intangible Heritage of Humanity
Traditional drama and theatre of Indonesia
Indonesian words and phrases
Theatre in Indonesia